Marta Morazzoni (born 1950) is an Italian educator and writer.

She was born at Gallarate in Lombardy and studied philosophy at the University of Milan. She taught high school literature at Gallarate. She published La Ragazza col turbante (The Girl with the Turban), a group of stories, in 1986; it was translated into nine languages. Her 1988 novel L'invenzione della verità (The invention of truth) was a finalist for the Premio Campiello. The novel Il caso Courrier published in 1997 was awarded the Premio Campiello and the United Kingdom Independent Foreign Fiction Award.

Selected works 
 Casa materna (His Mother's House), novel (1992) - finalist for the Premio Campiello
 L'estuario (Estuary), novel (1996)
 Una lezione di stile (A lesson in style), novel (2002)
 Un incontro inatteso per il consigliere Goethe (An unexpected meeting for counsellor Geothe) (2005)

References 

1950 births
Living people
20th-century Italian novelists
21st-century Italian novelists
Italian women short story writers
Italian women novelists
Premio Campiello winners
21st-century Italian women writers
20th-century Italian women writers
20th-century Italian short story writers
21st-century Italian short story writers